Erik Ross Palmer-Brown (born April 24, 1997) is an American professional soccer player who plays as a center-back for Ligue 1 club Troyes and the United States national team.

Career

Sporting Kansas City
Palmer-Brown moved to Lee's Summit, Missouri when he was 18 months old. He later  played one season of high school soccer as a freshman at Lee’s Summit High School in the fall of 2011. He also attended Archbishop O'Hara High School in Kansas City, Missouri. After playing in the U.S. Soccer Development Academy, at the age of 16, he signed his first professional contract, making him Sporting Kansas City's youngest ever player.

In January 2014, Serie A team Juventus reportedly made a $1 million bid for Erik Palmer-Brown, which was rejected by Sporting Kansas City. In the same year, Palmer-Brown was voted number 39 on UK website TeamTalk's top 50 Wonderkids in 2014.

He made his debut for Sporting Kansas City on May 18, 2014, in a regular season match against Chicago Fire. But it ended prematurely when he was sent off in the 64th minute for a second yellow card after giving away a penalty in the 15th minute in a 2–1 loss.

Porto
On February 1, 2016, Palmer-Brown was loaned to Portuguese club Porto until December 31, 2016. He started regularly in central defense for Porto B, helping them to the LigaPro title.

Manchester City
Palmer-Brown signed a contract with Premier League side Manchester City. He was immediately loaned to Belgian First Division A club KV Kortrijk until the end of the 2017–18 season.

Loan to NAC Breda
After spending the second half of the 2017–18 season with Kortrijk, Palmer-Brown was loaned to NAC Breda in the Eredivisie for the 2018–19 season.

Loan to Austria Wien 
He then joined Austria Wien for the 2019–20 season. He extended his loan at Austria Wien for the 2020–21 season.

Loan to Troyes
On August 31, 2021, Palmer-Brown moved to France to join Ligue 1 club Troyes on a season-long loan deal. In February 2022, the deal was made permanent with Palmer-Brown signing a contract until the summer of 2024.

International career
Palmer-Brown has represented the United States at the U-15, U-17, U-18, and U-20 levels. He has made 6 appearances for the U-18 team up to this point, scoring his first goal for the team in a 1–0 win over the Czech Republic. In 2015, he was called to the roster that played in the 2015 FIFA U-20 World Cup.

As captain, Palmer-Brown won the 2017 CONCACAF U-20 Championship with the United States. He was awarded the Golden Ball Award by CONCACAF as the best player of the tournament, playing the defensive midfield position. Palmer-Brown then played in central defense for the United States at the 2017 FIFA U-20 World Cup, and was named to the Best XI of the Tournament by both Squawka and Scouted Football.

On May 28, 2018, Palmer-Brown made his senior national team debut in a 3–0 win against Bolivia.

Personal life
Palmer-Brown was a student of Archbishop O'Hara High School in Kansas City, Missouri. He was confirmed as a Catholic in 2015.

Career statistics

International

Honors
Sporting Kansas City
Lamar Hunt U.S. Open Cup: 2017

United States U20
CONCACAF Under-20 Championship: 2017

Individual
CONCACAF Under-20 Championship Best XI: 2017
CONCACAF Under-20 Championship Golden Ball: 2017

References

External links
 
 
 

1997 births
Living people
American soccer players
Association football central defenders
American expatriate soccer players
People from Napoleon, Ohio
Soccer players from Ohio
People from Lee's Summit, Missouri
United States men's international soccer players
United States men's youth international soccer players
United States men's under-20 international soccer players
Sporting Kansas City players
FC Porto B players
Sporting Kansas City II players
Manchester City F.C. players
K.V. Kortrijk players
NAC Breda players
FK Austria Wien players
ES Troyes AC players
Soccer players from Missouri
Major League Soccer players
Liga Portugal 2 players
USL Championship players
Belgian Pro League players
Eredivisie players
Austrian Football Bundesliga players
Homegrown Players (MLS)
Expatriate footballers in Portugal
Expatriate footballers in England
Expatriate footballers in the Netherlands
Expatriate footballers in Belgium
Expatriate footballers in Austria
Expatriate footballers in France
American expatriate sportspeople in Portugal
American expatriate sportspeople in England
American expatriate sportspeople in Belgium
American expatriate sportspeople in the Netherlands
American expatriate sportspeople in Austria
American expatriate sportspeople in France
African-American Catholics